The 1981 TAA Formula Ford Driver to Europe Series was an Australian motor racing competition for Formula Ford racing cars.

The series, which was the twelfth Australian Formula Ford Series, was won by Phillip Revell driving a Lola T440.

Series schedule

The series was contested over eight rounds with one race per round.

Points system
Points were awarded on a 20, 15, 12, 10, 8, 6, 4, 3, 2, 1 basis for the first ten places at each round.

Series standings

References

TAA Formula Ford Driver to Europe Series
Australian Formula Ford Series